Walter Garland may refer to:
 Hank Garland (Walter Louis Garland), American guitarist and songwriter
 Walter Benjamin Garland, American soldier, activist, and politician